Derek Norman Twist (26 May 190515 August 1979) was a British screenwriter, film editor and director. He was sometimes credited as Derek N. Twist. During the 1930s he worked at British Gaumont.

Early life
Twist was born in Paddington area of London on 26 May 1905 to Cecil and Catherine Twist; his father was a solicitor.

He was married to actress and stage director Vida Hope until her death in a road accident in December 1963.

Selected filmography

Editor
 Sunshine Susie (1931)
 After the Ball (1932)
 Waltz Time (1933)
 The Fire Raisers (1934)
 Princess Charming (1934)
 Orders Is Orders (1934)
 Chu Chin Chow (1934)
 Aunt Sally (1934)
 The 39 Steps (1935)
 The Phantom Light (1935)
 The Passing of the Third Floor Back (1935)
 Rhodes of Africa (1936)
 The Edge of the World (1937)
 Kicking the Moon Around (1938)
 The Lion Has Wings (1939)

Writer
 They Drive by Night (1938)
 Murder Will Out (1940)
 Confidential Lady (1940)
 Dr. O'Dowd (1940)
 Old Bill and Son (1941)
 The End of the River (1947)
 All Over the Town (1949)
 Green Grow the Rushes (1951)
 Angels One Five (1952)
 Police Dog (1955)
 "Douglas Fairbanks Jr., Presents" (1955)
Overseas Press Club - Exclusive! (1957)
 Rx for Murder (1958)
 "International Detective" (1960)

Director
 The End of the River (1947)
 All Over the Town (1949)
 Green Grow the Rushes (1951)
 Police Dog (1955)
 "Douglas Fairbanks Jr., Presents" (1954-1957)
 Rx Murder (1958)

Producer
 Angels One Five (1952)

Production Manager
 Calamity the Cow (1967)

Actor
 Journey Together (1945) .... Wing Commander on Aircrew Interview Board
 Rx Murder (1958)

Bibliography
 Chibnall, Steve & McFarlane, Brian. The British B' Film. Palgrave MacMillan, 2009.

References

External links

1905 births
1979 deaths
British male screenwriters
British film editors
Film directors from London
People from Paddington
20th-century British screenwriters